Contradusta is a genus of sea snails, marine gastropod mollusks in the family Cypraeidae, the cowries.

Species
Species within the genus Contradusta  include:
Contradusta bregeriana (Crosse, 1868)
Contradusta lapillus Poppe, Tagaro & Groh, 2013
Contradusta walkeri (Sowerby I, 1832)
Species brought into synonymy
 Contradusta barclayi (Reeve, 1857): synonym of Paradusta barclayi (Reeve, 1857)
 Contradusta pulchella (Swainson, 1823): synonym of Ficadusta pulchella (Swainson, 1823)

References

 Meyer C. 2003. Molecular systematics of cowries (Gastropoda: Cypraeidae) and diversification patterns in the tropics. Biological Journal of the Linnean Society, 79: 401-459.

External links

Cypraeidae